Leo Harvey Diegel (April 20, 1899 – May 5, 1951) was an American professional golfer of the 1920s and early 1930s. He captured consecutive PGA Championships, played on the first four Ryder Cup teams, and is a member of the World Golf Hall of Fame.

Early years
Born in Gratiot Township, Wayne County, Michigan, Diegel began caddying at age ten and won his first significant event at age 17, the 1916 Michigan Open.

Career
Diegel was a runner-up in his first U.S. Open in 1920, one stroke behind champion Ted Ray. He won 28 PGA circuit events, and was a four-time winner of the Canadian Open (1924–25, 1928–29); a record for that event. In 1925, Diegel outperformed over 100 competitors to win the Florida Open (billed as the "Greatest Field Of Golfers Ever to Play in Florida") at the Temple Terrace Golf and Country Club.

Diegel was selected for the first four Ryder Cup teams in 1927, 1929, 1931, and 1933. His greatest season was 1928, with wins at the Canadian Open and the match play PGA Championship, where he stopped the four-year winning streak of Walter Hagen. Diegel defeated him in the quarterfinal to avenge earlier defeats in the 1925 quarterfinal and the 1926 final. Diegel achieved the rare feat of defending both titles successfully in 1929, this time defeating Hagen in the semifinals of the PGA. Diegel was a runner-up to Bobby Jones at the British Open in 1930.

Diegel was an excellent ball-striker, but struggled with his putting after joining the tour. After extensive experimentation, he eventually developed an unusual putting style where he pointed both elbows outwards; this was referred to as 'Diegeling'. He was a tour winner from 1920 to 1934, but dropped out of regular contention when he reached his mid-30s; a playful wrestling incident in Australia in late 1934 with friend Harry Cooper caused nerve damage to his right shoulder and  effectively ended his tour career.

Death
Diagnosed with throat and lung cancer in 1947, Diegel died at home in North Hollywood, California in 1951 at age 52; he had taken a position there as a club professional after scaling back his Tour play. He was buried in Michigan at Mount Olivet Cemetery in Detroit.

Diegel was inducted into the World Golf Hall of Fame in 2003.

Professional wins (36)

PGA Tour wins (28)
1920 (1) Pinehurst Fall Pro-Am Bestball (with Tommy Armour)
1921 (1) Coronado Beach Open
1922 (1) Shreveport Open
1923 (1) District of Columbia Open Championship
1924 (3) Shawnee Open, Canadian Open, Illinois Open
1925 (4) Florida Open, Canadian Open, Middle Atlantic Open, Mid South All Pro
1926 (1) Middle Atlantic Open
1927 (2) Middle Atlantic Open, San Diego Open
1928 (4) Long Beach Open (January; tie with Bill Mehlhorn), Canadian Open, PGA Championship, Massachusetts Open
1929 (4) San Diego Open, Miami International Four-Ball (with Walter Hagen), Canadian Open, PGA Championship
1930 (3) Pacific Southwest Pro, Oregon Open, San Francisco National Match Play Open
1933 (1) California Open
1934 (2) Rochester Open, New England PGA

Major championships are shown in bold.

Note: The PGA Tour and World Golf Hall of Fame list Diegel with 28 official wins. The PGA Tour book History of the PGA Tour lists 29 wins, and includes the 1925 Mid-Southern Amateur-Professional listed below.

Other wins (8)
Note: This list may be incomplete.
1916 Michigan Open
1919 Michigan Open
1922 Louisiana Open
1925 Mid-Southern Amateur-Professional
1926 Maryland Open
1931 California Open
1933 Timber Point Open, Southern California Open

Major championships

Wins (2)

Note: The PGA Championship was match play until 1958

Results timeline

NYF = Tournament not yet founded
DNQ = Did not qualify for match play portion 
CUT = missed the half-way cut
R64, R32, R16, QF, SF = Round in which player lost in PGA Championship match play
"T" indicates a tie for a place

Summary

Most consecutive cuts made – 31 (1920 U.S. Open – 1935 Masters)
Longest streak of top-10s – 4 (twice)

See also
List of golfers with most PGA Tour wins

References

External links

USGA Museum – Leo Diegel and his Magic Wand Putter
PGA Golf Professional Hall of Fame – member profiles

American male golfers
PGA Tour golfers
Ryder Cup competitors for the United States
Winners of men's major golf championships
World Golf Hall of Fame inductees
Golfers from Detroit
Golfers from California
People from Greater Los Angeles
1899 births
1951 deaths